Han Liu Bang is a Chinese television series based on the life of Liu Bang, the founding emperor of the Han dynasty. The series was first broadcast on CCTV in China in 1998.

List of episodes
The 35 episodes long series chronicles the events in Liu Bang's life: his humble origin as a low-ranking government officer; his involvement in the insurrection against the Qin dynasty; his struggle with Xiang Yu in the Chu–Han Contention; his enthronement; the major events in his reign; his death.

Cast
 Liu Wenzhi as Liu Bang
 Yu Xiaohui as Lü Zhi
 Wang Gang as Zhang Liang
 Li Hongwei as Han Xin
 Cheng Wenkuan as Xiao He
 Zhu Na as Consort Qi
 Zhang Lin as Xiang Yu
 Zhou Lu as Consort Yu
 Liu Zhongyuan as Fan Zeng

External links

1998 Chinese television series debuts
Television series set in the Western Han dynasty
Television series set in the Qin dynasty
1990s Chinese television series
Mandarin-language television shows
Chinese historical television series